Broken Dreams Club is an EP and the second release by indie rock band Girls, released on November 22, 2010 on True Panther Sounds.

Background
The EP was announced in a handwritten letter written by Girls frontman Christopher Owens. Owens described Broken Dreams Club as a "snapshot of the horizon" and "a taste of things to come."

Broken Dreams Club was the first Girls release to feature a full band (Girls was previously a collaboration between Owens and JR White). Some songs, such as "Substance," were written before Album'''s release. Caitlin Upton's infamous response at Miss Teen USA 2007 inspired the EP's closing track "Carolina." Owens felt much sympathy for Upton after seeing all the negative publicity she was receiving and wrote the song "about wanting to save someone from the ravenous wolves of just the way the modern world is."

Critical reception

Critical response to Broken Dreams Club was very positive. On the review aggregate site Metacritic, the EP has a score of 79 out of 100, indicating "Generally favorable reviews."

AllMusic's Jason Lymangrover wrote "If this is a sign of things to come, expect them to sound like Beirut or Grizzly Bear by their next full-length." Popmatters' Arnold Pan gave the EP a positive review, writing "What Girls prove more convincingly than ever on Broken Dreams Club is that sometimes a little stylistic schizophrenia can actually go a long way in shaping a singular artistic vision. So just how Owens and White mix-and-match forms and make clichés not sound like clichés might be a riddle wrapped in a mystery inside an enigma... but all you really need to know is that their formula works..." Pan also singled out the track "Carolina" for praise, calling it "a sprawling, multi-part piece that recalls and one-ups Girls’ first breakout number, 'Hellhole Ratrace.'" David Bevan of Pitchfork also gave Broken Dreams Club a positive review, writing "If Broken Dreams Club is indeed an honest glimpse of what's ahead, it sounds as though Girls have much more to give." The EP was also given a "Best New Music" designation in the review. Drowned in Sound's Sam Lewis, commenting on the EP's diverse musical styles, wrote "It’s a scatterbrainedness that makes Girls endearing and frustrating at the same time..." Lewis continued: "Still, it’s hard to begrudge a band their niche when they do it so well."Broken Dreams Club'' was ranked #22 on Pitchfork's "The Top 50 Albums of 2010" list. The same website also ranked the song "Carolina" #31 on its "Top 100 Tracks of 2010" list.

Track listing

Personnel
Adapted from AllMusic.

Girls
Garett Goddard – drums, background vocals
Matthew Kallman – Farfisa Organ, organ, electric piano
Ryan Lynch – guitar
Christopher Owens – cover art, guitar, horn arrangements, mixing, percussion, photography, vocals
Chet Jr. White – bass, horn arrangements, percussion, producer, synthesizer

Additional personnel
Ara Anderson – horn
Joel Behrman – horn
Dee Dee – background vocals
Richard Dodd – mastering
Dan Eisenberg – Hammond B3, piano
Rick Elmore – trombone
Corey Lee Granet – guitar
Tom Heyman – Pedal Steel
Dave McNair – mastering
Mike Olmos – trumpet
J.J. Wiesler – engineer, horn arrangements, Mellotron, mixing

Charts

As of 2012 the album has sold 19,000 copies in United States according to Nielsen SoundScan.

References

External links
 True Panther Sounds' page on Broken Dreams Club EP

2010 EPs
Girls (band) albums
True Panther Sounds albums
Indie rock EPs
Albums produced by Chet "JR" White